"Look at Me (When I Rock Wichoo)" is a song by American indie rock band Black Kids, taken from their debut album Partie Traumatic. It was released in the UK by Almost Gold Recordings on September 8, 2008 and debuted on the Top 200 UK Singles Chart at number 175.

Track listing
Digital single
 "Look at Me (When I Rock Wichoo)"
 "Look at Me (When I Rock Wichoo) (Kid Gloves remix)"

Personnel
 Owen Holmes – bass guitar
 Kevin Snow – drums
 Dawn Watley – keyboards and vocals
 Ali Youngblood – keyboards and vocals
 Reggie Youngblood – guitar and vocals

References

External links
Official Black Kids website

2008 singles
American songs
Black Kids songs
2008 songs